Byron Dalton Haines (November 30, 1914 – March 9, 2008) was an American football halfback who played one season in the National Football League for the Pittsburgh Pirates.  He played college football at the University of Washington and was drafted in the seventh round of the 1937 NFL Draft.

College
Haines was a three-year letterman at halfback while at Washington from 1934 to 1936, concluding with 1937 Rose Bowl.  Following his Washington career, Byron played in the Chicago Tribune All-Star Game.

References

External links
 Byron Haines passes away

1914 births
2008 deaths
American football running backs
Washington Huskies football players
Pittsburgh Steelers players
Sportspeople from Bend, Oregon